Silver certificates are a type of representative money issued between 1878 and 1964 in the United States as part of its circulation of paper currency.  They were produced in response to silver agitation by citizens who were angered by the Fourth Coinage Act, which had effectively placed the United States on a gold standard.  The certificates were initially redeemable for their face value of silver dollar coins and later (for one year – June 24, 1967 to June 24, 1968) in raw silver bullion.  Since 1968 they have been redeemable only in Federal Reserve Notes and are thus obsolete, but still valid legal tender at their face value and thus are still an accepted form of currency.

In 1928, all United States bank notes were re-designed and the size reduced. The complete type set below is part of the National Numismatic Collection at the Smithsonian's National Museum of American History.

History
The Coinage Act of 1873 intentionally omitted language authorizing the coinage of “standard” silver dollars and ended the bimetallic standard that had been created by Alexander Hamilton. While the Coinage Act of 1873 stopped production of silver dollars, it was the 1874 adoption of Section 3568 of the Revised Statutes that actually removed legal tender status from silver certificates in the payment of debts exceeding five dollars. By 1875 business interests invested in silver (e.g., Western banks, mining companies) wanted the bimetallic standard restored. People began to refer to the passage of the Act as the Crime of '73. Prompted by a sharp decline in the value of silver in 1876, Congressional representatives from Nevada and Colorado, states responsible for over 40% of the world's silver yield in the 1870s and 1880s, began lobbying for change. Further public agitation for silver use was driven by fear that there was not enough money in the community. Members of Congress claimed ignorance that the 1873 law would lead to the demonetization of silver, despite having had three years to review the bill prior to enacting it to law. Some blamed the passage of the Act on a number of external factors including a conspiracy involving foreign investors and government conspirators. In response, the Bland–Allison Act, as it came to be known, was passed by Congress (over a presidential veto) on February 28, 1878.  It did not provide for the "free and unlimited coinage of silver" demanded by Western miners, but it did require the United States Treasury to purchase between  million and  million of silver bullion per month from mining companies in the West, to be minted into coins.

Large-size silver certificates

The first silver certificates (Series 1878) were issued in denominations of  through . Reception by financial institutions was cautious. While more convenient and less bulky than dollar coins, the silver certificate was not accepted for all transactions. The Bland–Allison Act established that they were “receivable for customs, taxes, and all public dues,” and could be included in bank reserves, but silver certificates were not explicitly considered legal tender for private interactions (i.e., between individuals). Congress used the National Banking Act of July 12, 1882 to clarify the legal tender status of silver certificates by clearly authorizing them to be included in the lawful reserves of national banks. The introduction of low-denomination currency (as denominations of U.S. Notes under  were put on hold) greatly increased circulation.

Small-size silver certificates

Treasury Secretary Franklin MacVeagh (1909–13) appointed a committee to investigate possible advantages (e.g., reduced cost, increased production speed) to issuing smaller sized United States banknotes. Due in part to the outbreak of World War I and the end of his appointed term, any recommendations may have stalled. On August 20, 1925, Treasury Secretary Andrew W. Mellon appointed a similar committee and in May 1927 accepted their recommendations for the size reduction and redesign of U.S. banknotes. On July 10, 1929 the new small-size currency was issued.

In keeping with the verbiage on large-size silver certificates, all the small-size Series 1928 certificates carried the obligation "This certifies that there has (or have) been deposited in the Treasury of the United States of America X silver dollar(s) payable to the bearer on demand" or "X dollars in silver coin payable to the bearer on demand". This required that the Treasury maintain stocks of silver dollars to back and redeem the silver certificates in circulation. Beginning with the Series 1934 silver certificates the wording was changed to "This certifies that there is on deposit in the Treasury of the United States of America X dollars in silver payable to the bearer on demand." This freed the Treasury from storing bags of silver dollars in its vaults, and allowed it to redeem silver certificates with bullion or silver granules, rather than silver dollars. Years after the government stopped the redemption of silver certificates for silver, large quantities of silver dollars intended specifically to satisfy the earlier obligation for redemption in silver dollars were found in Treasury vaults.

As was usual with currency during this period, the year date on the bill did not reflect when it was printed, but rather a major design change. Under the Silver Purchase Act of 1934, the authority to issue silver certificates was given to the U.S. Secretary of Treasury. Additional changes, particularly when either of the two signatures was altered, led to a letter being added below the date. One notable exception was the Series 1935G  silver certificate, which included notes both with and without the motto "In God We Trust" on the reverse. 1935 dated one dollar certificates lasted through the letter "H", after which new printing processes began the 1957 series.  In some cases printing plates were used until they wore out, even though newer ones were also producing notes, so the sequencing of signatures may not always be chronological.  Thus some of the 1935 dated one dollar certificates were issued as late as 1963.

World War II Issues

In response to the Japanese attack on Pearl Harbor, the Hawaii overprint note was ordered from the Bureau of Engraving and Printing on June 8, 1942 (all were made-over 1934–1935 bills). Stamped “HAWAII” (in small solid letters on the obverse and large letters on the reverse), with the Treasury seal and serial numbers in brown instead of the usual blue, these notes could be demonetized in the event of a Japanese invasion. Additional World War II emergency currency was issued in November 1942 for circulation in Europe and Northern Africa. Printed with a bright yellow seal, these notes ($1, and ) could be demonetized should the United States lose its position in the European or North African campaigns.

"Star notes"
When a bill is damaged in printing it is normally replaced by another one (the star replaces a letter at the edge of the note). To keep the amounts issued consistent, these replacement banknotes are normally indicated by a star in the separately sequenced serial number. For silver certificates this asterisk appears at the beginning of the serial number.

End of the silver certificates

In the nearly three decades since passage of the Silver Purchase Act of 1934, the annual demand for silver bullion rose steadily from roughly 11 million ounces (1933) to 110 million ounces (1962). The Acts of 1939 and 1946 established floor prices for silver of 71 cents and 90.5 cents (respectively) per ounce. Predicated on an anticipated shortage of silver bullion, Public Law 88-36 (PL88-36) was enacted on June 4, 1963 which repealed the Silver Purchase Act of 1934, and the Acts of July 6, 1939 and July 31, 1946, while providing specific instruction regarding the disposition of silver held as reserves against issued certificates and the price at which silver may be sold. It also amended the Federal Reserve Act to authorize the issue of lower denomination notes (i.e.,  and ), allowing for the gradual retirement (or swapping out process) of  silver certificates and releasing silver bullion from reserve. In repealing the earlier laws, PL88-36 also repealed the authority of the Secretary of the Treasury to control the issue of silver certificates. By issuing Executive Order 11110, President John F. Kennedy was able to continue the Secretary's authority. While retaining their status as legal tender, the silver certificate had effectively been retired from use.

In March 1964, Secretary of the Treasury C. Douglas Dillon halted redemption of silver certificates for silver dollar coins; during the following four years, silver certificates were redeemable in uncoined silver "granules". All redemption in silver ceased on June 24, 1968.  While there are some exceptions (particularly for some of the very early issues as well as the experimental bills) the vast majority of small sized one dollar silver certificates, especially non-star or worn bills of the 1935 and 1957 series, are worth little or nothing above their face values. They can still occasionally be found in circulation.

Issue

Large-size United States silver certificates (1878–1923)

Series and varieties

Complete typeset

Small-size United States silver certificates (1928–1957)

See also

 Gold certificate (United States)
 Silver as an investment
 Silver certificate (Cuba)
 Silver standard

Explanatory footnotes

Citations

General references

Further reading

External links

Bureau of Engraving and Printing
U.S. Department of the Treasury
USPaperMoney.Info

Currency lists
Historical currencies of the United States
Paper money of the United States
Silver